Petregan playa (in Persian: دق پترگان) is a playa (دق dagh in Persian) in eastern part of Iran next to the border with Afghanistan.

It is located in the Zirkuh County in South Khorasan Province, 610 m above the sea level and most of its area lies within Iranian territory.

There are footprints of the pre-historical animals found in this playa. Research by Iranian scholars on 40 footprints show that these animals were moving in groups from east to west and the area at that time was muddy marshland.

Sources
irandeserts.com, accessed Febr. 2009. (in Persian)

Deserts of Iran
Geography of Razavi Khorasan Province